Anicet Le Pors (born 28 April 1931) is a French politician. Formed as an engineer in meteorology working for the Météorologie nationale (Météo-France), he served as a member of the French Senate from 1977 to 1981. He served as the Minister of Civil Service and Reforms from 1981 to 1984. He became a Commander of the Legion of Honour on 13 July 2016.

References

Living people
1931 births
French Senators of the Fifth Republic
French Communist Party politicians
French Ministers of Civil Service
Commandeurs of the Légion d'honneur
Senators of Hauts-de-Seine
Météo-France staff